The Northern Pacific Depot or Villard Depot is a historic railway station in Villard, Minnesota, United States, built in 1882.  It is listed on the National Register of Historic Places for having local significance in exploration/settlement and transportation.  The depot was constructed upon the completion of a new Northern Pacific Railway line and the platting of a new trackside town named after the railway's president Henry Villard.  The Little Falls and Dakota Branch line, running between Little Falls and Morris, Minnesota, provided a key link between the agricultural region of west-central Minnesota and the Great Lakes port of Duluth.  The depot now marks the eastern terminus of the Villard–Starbuck Trail, a rail trail in development from Villard through Glenwood, Starbuck, and on to Glacial Lakes State Park.

See also
 National Register of Historic Places listings in Pope County, Minnesota

References

Buildings and structures in Pope County, Minnesota
Former railway stations in Minnesota
Former Northern Pacific Railway stations
Railway stations on the National Register of Historic Places in Minnesota
Railway stations in the United States opened in 1882
National Register of Historic Places in Pope County, Minnesota